Li Fanwu (May 3, 1912 – 1986) original name Li Fude, also known as Zhang Song, was a People's Republic of China politician. He was born in Muling, Mudanjiang, Heilongjiang Province. He was governor of his home province. He was a delegate to the 3rd National People's Congress

1912 births
1986 deaths
People's Republic of China politicians from Heilongjiang
Chinese Communist Party politicians from Heilongjiang
Governors of Heilongjiang
Delegates to the 3rd National People's Congress